The Santana 27 is an American sailboat, that was designed by Gary Mull and first built in 1967. The design is out of production.

Production
The boat was built by W. D. Schock Corporation in the United States between 1967 and 1974, with 210 boats completed.<ref name="Guide"/

Design
The Santana 27 is a small recreational keelboat, built predominantly of fiberglass, with wooden trim. It has a masthead sloop rig, an internally-mounted spade-type rudder and a fixed fin keel. It displaces  and carries  of iron ballast.

The boat has a PHRF racing average handicap of 201 with a high of 211 and low of 198.

See also
List of sailing boat types

References

External links

Keelboats
1960s sailboat type designs
Sailing yachts 
Sailboat type designs by Gary Mull
Sailboat types built by W. D. Schock Corp